Addicted to Your Love may refer to:

"Addicted to Your Love", single by The Gap Band from Round Trip (The Gap Band album) #8 R&B chart
"Addicted to Your Love" by Muscle Shoals Horns from Fizzyology
Addicted to Your Love (The Shady Brothers song) 2014